Marlborough Township is a former incorporated and now geographic township in eastern Ontario, Canada.

Marlborough was located in the southern part of Carleton County. It was bounded to the south by Oxford Township, to the southwest by Montague Township, to the northwest by Goulbourn Township and to the northeast by North Gower Township. The Rideau River runs along the border with Oxford Township.

It was established in 1791. In 1800, it became part of Carleton County and was incorporated as a township in 1850. The first family to settle in this area was that of Stephen Burritt, a United Empire Loyalist, in 1793. The township merged with North Gower Township in 1974 to become Rideau Township. Rideau, in turn, became part of the amalgamated city of Ottawa in 2001.

Marlborough Township took its name from John Churchill, 1st Duke of Marlborough.

According to the Canada 2016 Census, the Township had a population of 2,204. According to the Canada 2021 Census, this had increased to 2,368.

Reeves
1850 John Pierce
1852 S. Burrett
1853 William Mackey
1857 William Kidd
1861 William Mackey
1867 J. Mills
1869 William Kidd
1871 Hugh Conn
1872 James Mills
1875 William Hill
1878 W.R. Pierce
1881 R. Mackey
1889 R. Beckett
1893 R. Mackey
1897 n/a
1907 George Bearman
1912 W. Ormrod
1918 W.H. Pratt
1923 A.H. Davidson
1933 James S. Meredith
1936 Ernest Cole
1938 J. Cliff Donnelly

See also
List of townships in Ontario

References

Former municipalities now in Ottawa
Geographic townships in Ontario
Populated places disestablished in 2001